Moosterbach is a river of Mecklenburg-Vorpommern, Germany. It flows into a branch of the Elde near Siggelkow.

See also
List of rivers of Mecklenburg-Vorpommern

Rivers of Mecklenburg-Western Pomerania
Rivers of Germany